Sangyuan is a town under the administration of Xixiang County in Shaanxi, China. , it has one residential community and eight villages under its administration.

References 

Township-level divisions of Shaanxi
Xixiang County